Soundtracks Volume 2 is a 2003 album of film music by Marc Ribot released on Tzadik Records.

Reception
The Allmusic review by Sean Westergaard states, "The already eclectic Marc Ribot may have released his widest-reaching album to date with Soundtracks, Vol. 2. From neo-Dixieland to spooky electronica to solo shakuhachi, Ribot turns in a head-spinning program of disparate genres that hang together surprisingly well as an album... Ribot's guitar credentials have never been in doubt, but his recent works for Tzadik is showing him to be an impressive composer with a broad palette as well".

Track listing
All compositions are by Marc Ribot.
 "Small Consolation" – 0:52
 "Prowler" – 2:57
 "House of Mirrors" – 1:48
 "Urbanight" – 2:38
 "Shockuhachi" – 1:23
 "Blue Party" – 1:07
 "The Beast in the Jungle" – 2:27
 "Nausea" – 2:57
 "Savannah" – 2:15
 "Miles to Go" – 1:01
 "The Dream of the Other" – 1:02
 "Green Party" – 0:52
 "Pensando" – 3:52
 "Blurry in Brooklyn" – 1:48
 "The Killing Zone" – 5:07
 "Flatbush Eye" – 1:27
 "Miles Behind" – 0:57
 "Requiem for Eitan" – 3:03
 "Penitant Skyline" – 0:40
 "The Persistence of Memory" – 7:35
 "Lost Children" – 5:18
 "Green Party (Radio Mix)" – 0:50

 Tracks 1, 3, 6, 8, 10, 12, 17, 19 and 22 were recorded at Sperry Sound, New York City and written for Gregory Feldman's Joe Schmo (1999).
 Tracks 2, 5, 13, 15, 16, 20 and 21 were recorded at Ribosound Studios, New York City and written for Michele Stephenson's The Killing Zone (2003), except track 20, which was written for Jennifer Reeves' The Time We Killed (2004).
 Tracks 4, 7, 9, 11, 14 and 18 were recorded at The Magic Shop, New York City and written for Michele Stephenson's The Killing Zone (2003).

Personnel
Marc Ribot – guitars, trumpet, Eb horn, sequencer
Anthony Coleman (3, 6, 8, 10, 12, 22) – sampler, piano, organ
Matt Darriau (1, 3) – clarinet
Alex Foster (3, 6, 10, 12, 17, 19, 22) – clarinet, saxophone
JD Foster (1, 3, 6, 10, 12, 17, 19, 22) – bass
Roberto Rodriguez (1, 3, 6, 10, 12, 17, 22) – drums
Steven Bernstein (7, 18) – trumpet
Mark Feldman (4, 7, 11, 14, 18) – violin
Jill Jaffe (4, 7, 11, 14, 18) – viola
Francois Lardeau (16, 20) – drum sequencing
Frank London (2, 5, 7, 9, 11, 13–16, 18, 21) – trumpet
Jay Rodriguez (14) – saxophone
E.J. Rodriguez (4, 7, 14) – percussion
Ned Rothenberg (5, 15, 20) – shakuhachi flute, flute, alto
Peter Scherer (4, 7, 11, 14, 18) – sampler, piano, synthesizer
Sebastian Steinberg (4, 7, 9, 11,14–16) – bass

References

Marc Ribot albums
2003 soundtrack albums
Film soundtracks
Tzadik Records soundtracks
Soundtrack compilation albums
Tzadik Records compilation albums
2003 compilation albums